INS Himgiri is the second ship of the  stealth guided missile frigates being built by Garden Reach Shipbuilders and Engineers for the Indian Navy. The ship was laid down on 10 November 2018 and it was launched on 14 December 2020. The ship is expected to be commissioned by August 2023.

See also
 Future of the Indian Navy

References

Frigates of the Indian Navy
Indian Navy
Nilgiri-class frigates
2020 ships